Pluchea odorata is a species of flowering plant in the aster family, Asteraceae. Common names include sweetscent, saltmarsh fleabane and shrubby camphorweed.

Distribution
The plant is native to the United States, Mexico, Central America, the Caribbean, and northern South America.
It inhabits wetlands and other coastal habitats and moist inland areas, often in saline substrates.

It is an introduced species and a noxious weed in Hawaii and New Caledonia.

Description
Pluchea odorata is an annual or perennial herb growing erect to a maximum height over one meter. It is glandular, coated in rough trichomes (hairs), and strongly aromatic.

The inflorescence is a large cluster of many flower heads.

The fruit is a tiny achene tipped with a bristly pappus.

Uses
In some parts of the Caribbean, saltmarsh fleabane is a widely consumed medicinal herbal tea. The hot tea made from the leaves is a stimulant. It stimulates perspiration, in the manner of pleurisy root or pennyroyal, and is diuretic. It is a safe and reliable menstrual stimulant when flow begins late, is scanty, and there are clotty cramps.  Moreover, it is antispasmodic, thus relieving cramping.  It similarly inhibits spasms and cramps from diarrhea and stomach ache.  Used as an eyewash it reduces redness and pain from hay fever, wind and dust.  Tea concentrate has been marketed as a coffee substitute.  Unlike coffee which is a vasoconstrictor, sweetscent tea is a vasodilator. It is contraindicated for people who get migraines, during pregnancy, and should be used in moderation.

Gallery

References

External links

Jepson Manual Treatment
USDA Plants Profile
Photo gallery

odorata
Flora of the Caribbean
Flora of North America
Flora of Central America
Flora of northern South America
Natural history of the Central Valley (California)
Natural history of the Mojave Desert
Plants described in 1826